Buck Island Reef National Monument protects Buck Island, a small, uninhabited 176-acre (712,000 m²) island about  north of the northeast coast of Saint Croix, U.S. Virgin Islands, and 18,839 acres of submerged lands, totaling 19,015 acres. It was first established as a protected area by the U.S. Government in 1948, with the intention of preserving “one of the finest marine gardens in the Caribbean Sea.” The U.S. National Monument was created in 1961 by John F. Kennedy and greatly expanded in 2001 by Bill Clinton, over the opposition of local fishermen. Buck Island National Monument is one of few places in the Virgin Islands where brown pelicans and threatened least terns nest.

Most of the Monument area, which is administered by the National Park Service, is underwater and attracts around 50,000 visitors a year. With its  reef there is plenty to explore and experience in the water. Snorkelers can follow a marked underwater trail on the eastern tip. It is one of only three underwater trails in the United States. Along the trail are plaques denoting information about marine flora and fauna commonly found in the area. Two thirds of the island is surrounded by an elkhorn coral barrier reef, providing an ecosystem for over 250 fish species and a variety of other marine life including spotted eagle rays, nurse sharks and lemon sharks, and juvenile Blacktip reef sharks and Whitetip reef sharks. In the spring endangered Leatherback turtles come onto the beach to nest while Green turtles and Hawksbill turtles nest during the summer months. Turtle Beach on the western edge of the island features a pristine white sand beach and has been voted one of the world's most beautiful beaches by National Geographic.

The National Park Service has been monitoring Buck Island for over 40 years. Most of the research is focused on coral, fish, sea turtles, brown pelicans and least tern nesting. West beach is one of the most active turtle nesting beaches in the world with one of the longest continually operating research programs.

To ensure the ecosystem continues to thrive, the National Park Service requires all visitors to use authorized concessioners providing guided tours or have a permit if on private vessels without paying customers. To help protect the natural environment, visitors are encouraged to wear non-toxic reef safe sunscreen or a rash guard while swimming in the waters surrounding Buck Island Reef National Monument.

Gallery

See also
 List of national monuments of the United States

References

External links
 NPS: official Buck Island Reef National Monument website
 Fish Assemblages and Benthic Habitats of Buck Island Reef National Monument (St. Croix, U.S. Virgin Islands) and the Surrounding Seascape:  A Characterization of Spatial and Temporal Patterns National Oceanic and Atmospheric Administration

National Monuments in the United States Virgin Islands
Marine parks of the United States Virgin Islands
Saint Croix, U.S. Virgin Islands
Uninhabited islands of the United States Virgin Islands
Protected areas established in 1961
1961 establishments in the United States Virgin Islands